Capitosaurus is an extinct genus of temnospondyl amphibians whose remains have been found in Spitsbergen and Germany. Its skull was 30 cm long, with a total length over 122 cm. Several species have been assigned to the genus over the years, but only C. polaris is still valid today.

References

Triassic temnospondyls of Europe
Fossils of Germany
Prehistoric tetrapod genera
Monotypic amphibian genera